Uziel "Uzi" Gal (born Gotthard Glas; 15 December 1923 – 7 September 2002) was an Israeli firearm designer, best remembered as the designer and namesake of the Uzi submachine gun.

Biography
Gal was born in Weimar, Germany to Miele and Erich Glas. When the Nazis came to power in 1933, he first moved to the United Kingdom and later in 1936 to Kibbutz Yagur in the British Mandate of Palestine, where he changed his name to Uziel Gal. In 1943, he was arrested for illegally carrying a gun and was sentenced to six years in prison. However, he was pardoned and released in 1946 (serving less than half of his sentence).

Gal began designing the Uzi submachine gun shortly after the founding of Israel and the 1948 Arab–Israeli War. In 1951, it was officially adopted by the Israel Defense Forces and was called the Uzi after its creator. Gal did not want the weapon to be named after him but his request was denied. In 1955, he was decorated with the Tzalash haRamatkal and in 1958, Gal was the first person to receive the Israel Security Award, presented to him by Prime Minister David Ben-Gurion for his work on the Uzi.

Gal retired from the IDF in 1975, and moved to the United States the following year. He settled in Philadelphia so that his daughter, Tamar, who had serious brain damage, could receive extended medical treatment there.

In the early 1980s, Gal assisted in the creation of the Ruger MP9 submachine gun.

Gal continued his work as a firearms designer in the United States until his death from cancer in 2002. His body was flown back to Yagur for burial.

References

External links
 Uziel Gal biography by his son, Iddo Gal

1923 births
2002 deaths
Weapon designers
Weapon design
Firearm designers
Israeli military personnel
Israeli colonels
Israel Defense Prize recipients
Deaths from cancer in Pennsylvania
Recipients of British royal pardons
Jewish emigrants from Nazi Germany to the United Kingdom
Israeli inventors
Jewish emigrants from Nazi Germany to Mandatory Palestine
Israeli emigrants to the United States
Israeli people of German-Jewish descent